Streptomyces jeddahensis is a bacterium species from the genus of Streptomyces which has been isolated from arid soil from Saudi Arabia.

See also 
 List of Streptomyces species

References

External links
Type strain of Streptomyces jeddahensis at BacDive -  the Bacterial Diversity Metadatabase

jeddahensis
Bacteria described in 2017